Schulz is a common German and Jewish-Ashkenazi family name from Germany, particularly Northern Germany. The word Schulz originates from the local official title of Schultheiß or (Dorf-)Schulz(e), meaning village headman or constable / sheriff in the medieval sense (akin to today's office of mayor).

In East Central Germany and Silesia, the "u" was often replaced by "o"; see also Scholz and Scholtz.

People named Schulz 

 Andrew Schulz (born 1983), comedian
 Axel Schulz, (born 1968), German boxer
 Bernd Schulz, footballer
 Bruno Schulz, Polish Jewish writer
 Charles M. Schulz (1922–2000), American cartoonist, author of Peanuts
 Ervin Harold Schulz (1911-1978), American businessman, newspaper editor, and politician
 Erwin Schulz (1900–1981), German Nazi SS general and Holocaust perpetrator
 Emil Schulz (1938–2010), German boxer
 Friedemann Schulz von Thun (born 1944), German psychologist
 Friedrich Schulz (1897–1976), German general
 Günter Schulz, guitarist
 Günter Victor Schulz (1905-1999), German chemist
 Hermann Schulz (1872–1929), German politician
 Hermann Schulz (born 1961), German figure skater
 Hilde Schulz-Amelang (born 1938), German rower
 Hugo Paul Friedrich Schulz (1853–1932), German pharmacologist
 Issa Schultz (born 1984), Australian media personality 
 Jay Schulz (born 1985), Australian Rules Football player
 Jimmy Schulz (1968-2019), German politician
 Johann Abraham Peter Schulz (1747–1800), musician and composer
 Josef Schulz (died 1941), German soldier during World War II
 Karel Schulz, Czech novelist
 Karl Schulz, German footballer 
 Karl-Lothar Schulz (1907–1972), German paratrooper of World War II
 Kathryn Schulz, American journalist and writer
 Kirk Schulz, president of Washington State University
 Lotte Schulz (1925-2016), Paraguayan artist
 Markus Schulz, Miami DJ
 Martin Schulz (born 1955), German politician
 Matt Schulz, drummer
 Nico Schulz (born 1993), German football player
 Noel Schulz, American engineer
 Otto Eugen Schulz, German botanist (abbreviated O. E. Schulz in taxonomy)
 Patrick Schulz, German professional wrestler
 Peter Schulz (1930–2013), German politician
 Robin Schulz (born 1973), German musician, DJ and record producer
 Roy F. Schulz (1920-2010), American politician and farmer
 Swen Schulz (born 1968), German politician
 Uwe Schulz (born 1961), German politician
 Victor H. Schulz (1910-1987), American farmer and politician
 Werner Schulz (1950–2022), German politician
 Werner Schulz (footballer) (1913–1947), German footballer
 Wilhelm Phillip Daniel Schulz (1805–1877), also known as Guillermo Schulz, German-Spanish mine engineer and geologist

People named Shultz
 Brett Schultz (born 1970), South African cricketer
 Dave Schultz (amateur wrestler) (1959–1996), American Olympic wrestler 
 David Schultz (professional wrestler) (born 1955), American professional wrestler 
 George Shultz (1920–2021), former US Secretary of State
 Matt Shultz (born 1983), American singer, songwriter, and musician
 Mikhail Shultz (1919–2006), Soviet/Russian physical chemist and artist
 Searles G. Shultz (1897–1975), New York politician

See also

German-language surnames
Occupational surnames
Jewish surnames